Peter Brander (20 July 1927 – 2 April 2013) was a British boxer. Brander competed in the men's featherweight event at the 1948 Summer Olympics. He represented England and won a bronze medal in the 57kg division at the 1950 British Empire Games in Auckland, New Zealand.

He won the 1946, 1948 and 1950 Amateur Boxing Association British featherweight title, when boxing out of the Slough Centre ABC.

1948 Olympic results
Below is the record of Peter Brander, a British featherweight boxer who competed at the 1948 London Olympics:

 Round of 32: lost to Mohamed Ammi (France) on points

References

External links
 

1927 births
2013 deaths
British male boxers
Olympic boxers of Great Britain
Boxers at the 1948 Summer Olympics
Sportspeople from Southampton
Commonwealth Games medallists in boxing
Boxers at the 1950 British Empire Games
Commonwealth Games bronze medallists for England
Featherweight boxers
Medallists at the 1950 British Empire Games